Lovely to See You: Live is a two-disc live album by The Moody Blues.  Released on 15 November 2005, Lovely to See You: Live was recorded at a performance at the Greek Theater in Los Angeles, California.  The album is named after The Moody Blues song "Lovely to See You", from their 1969 album On the Threshold of a Dream.  Unlike the Moody Blues' two previous live albums A Night at Red Rocks with the Colorado Symphony Orchestra and Hall of Fame, Lovely to See You: Live does not feature a live orchestra.  It is also their first live album since Ray Thomas retired due to health issues.

Track listing
All songs written by Justin Hayward, except where noted.

Disc One
 "Lovely to See You" – 4:13
 "Tuesday Afternoon (Forever Afternoon)" – 4:23
 "Lean on Me (Tonight)" (John Lodge) – 4:44
 "The Actor" – 5:46
 "Steppin' in a Slide Zone"  (Lodge) – 4:51
 "The Voice" – 4:17
 "Talking Out of Turn" (Lodge) – 5:43
 "I Know You're Out There Somewhere" – 5:23
 "The Story in Your Eyes" – 3:54

Disc Two
 "Forever Autumn" (Jeff Wayne, Paul Vigrass, Gary Osborne) – 4:33
 "Your Wildest Dreams" – 4:55
 "Isn't Life Strange" (Lodge) – 7:48
 "The Other Side of Life" – 5:06
 "December Snow" – 4:45
 "Higher and Higher" (Graeme Edge) – 5:07
 "Are You Sitting Comfortably?" (Hayward, Ray Thomas) – 4:43
 "I'm Just a Singer (In a Rock and Roll Band)" (Lodge) – 6:46
 "Nights in White Satin" – 6:00
 "Question" – 6:09
 "Ride My See-Saw" (Lodge) - 5:12

Personnel
 Justin Hayward: vocals, guitar
 John Lodge: vocals, bass, guitar
 Graeme Edge: drums, vocals

Additional personnel
 Gordon Marshall: drums
 Paul Bliss: keyboards
 Bernie Barlow: keyboards, backing vocals
 Norda Mullen: flute, guitar, backing vocals

The Moody Blues live albums
2005 live albums
Albums recorded at the Greek Theatre (Los Angeles)